Ben Mario Gaston Santermans (born 26 June 1992) is a Belgian professional footballer who plays as a centre back for Diest.

Career

Club career
In January 2020, Santermans was loaned out from Lommel SK to Lierse Kempenzonen until the end of the season. However, Lierse confirmed on 15 April 2020, that Santermans would join the club permanently from the next season, signing a one-year deal with an option for one further year.

For the 2021–22 season, he joined fifth-tier club Diest.

References

External links
 Voetbal International profile 
 

1992 births
Living people
Sportspeople from Hasselt
Footballers from Limburg (Belgium)
Belgian footballers
Belgian expatriate footballers
Challenger Pro League players
Belgian Third Division players
Eerste Divisie players
K.R.C. Genk players
K Beerschot VA players
Lommel S.K. players
FC Den Bosch players
Lierse Kempenzonen players
K.F.C. Diest players
Association football central defenders
Belgian expatriate sportspeople in the Netherlands
Expatriate footballers in the Netherlands